Potosí or Potosi may refer to:

Places

United States 
 Potosi, Missouri, in Washington County
 Potosi, Nevada, a ghost town in Clark County, Nevada 
 Potosi, Texas, in Taylor County
 Potosi (town), Wisconsin, in Grant County
 Potosi, Wisconsin, a village within the Town of Potosi

Elsewhere
 Potosí, the capital of Potosí Department, Bolivia, a UNESCO World Heritage Site
 Potosí Department, a department in southwestern Bolivia
 Potosi, Venezuela, a disestablished town in Táchira
 San Luis Potosí City, capital and most populous city of San Luis Potosí, Mexico

Mountains
 Potosi Mountain (Nevada), U.S.
 Potosí mountain range or Cordillera de Potosí, to the southeast of the city of Potosí, Bolivia
 Potosi Peak, in the Sneffels Range, Colorado, US
 Cerro de Potosí, a mountain near the city of Potosí, Bolivia, also known as Cerro Rico;  a Spanish colonial mining site 
 Cerro Potosí, a mountain in Nuevo León, Mexico
 Huayna Potosí, a mountain in the La Paz Department, Bolivia
 Wayna Potosí (Oruro), a mountain in the Oruro Department, Bolivia

Other uses 
 Potosi (barque), an 1895 German sailing ship named after the Bolivian city
 Potosi Correctional Center, a prison near Potosi, Missouri
 Potosi Mining District, in Clark County, Nevada
 Potosi, Trelawny, Jamaica, a former sugar plantation
 Potosi Pinyon (Pinus culminicola), a species of pine tree native to northeast Mexico
 Potosi pupfish (Cyprinodon alvarezi), a species of fish once endemic to Mexico, but now extinct in the wild

See also
 Potosi Mine (disambiguation)
 Potosi Mountain (disambiguation)